Gardiner's Seychelles frog (Sechellophryne gardineri) is a small frog of the family Sooglossidae and endemic to the Seychelles. It is named after John Stanley Gardiner, English zoologist and oceanographer.

Description
Newly hatched frogs measure  in length. It is brown in color, and has a dark stripe running from its mouth to its legs.

This frog is notable for its ability to hear despite the absence of a middle ear cavity. Research has shown that the species is able to use its mouth cavity to amplify sound and transmit it to the inner ear,as explained by co-author Jean-François Aubry.

Ecology and behavior
Gardiner's frog is a terrestrial frog, feeding on small invertebrates including mites, sciarid larvae, ants, and amphipods. It is restricted to the high- and mid-altitude areas of Mahé and Silhouette Islands of the Seychelles group. This is unusual among the Sooglossidae, as most are restricted to the high altitudes, which have a stable climate due to constant mist. Eggs are laid in small clumps on moist ground and hatch as fully formed small adult frogs. Although Gardiner's frog is common at many sites, it is classified as endangered by the IUCN Red List because it is restricted to only three locations representing five subpopulations.

Taxonomy 
Genetic analysis indicates that the two populations of this species are distinct from each other and are possibly even separate species. It has thus been proposed that both populations be considered evolutionary significant units for conservation purposes.

References

External links

Monitoring and research into Seychelles amphibians and reptiles

Sechellophryne
Amphibians of Seychelles
Endemic fauna of Seychelles
Amphibians described in 1911
Taxa named by George Albert Boulenger